Council elections were held in 2016 in Sydney to elect the Sydney City Council. The elections coincided with the 2016 New South Wales local elections.

Clover Moore was re-elected Lord Mayor of Sydney.

Background
Clover Moore, an independent who has served as Lord Mayor since 2004, successfully won the last election, held in 2012.

In 2014, she did not declare her candidacy, prompting many to believe she would not run.

Many parties, namely the Liberals, used the slogan "No Moore" in their election campaigns.

Moore successfully won a fourth consecutive term in office.

Electoral system
Unlike other councils in Sydney and elsewhere in Australia, the Sydney City Council has no wards.

Newspaper endorsements

References

External links
 Official results

Local elections in Australia
Sydney City Council elections